The Hoax is an American Christian hardcore band, and they primarily play hardcore punk. They come from Anaheim, California. The band started making music in 2005, and their members are lead vocalist, Tyler Dunagan, lead guitarist, Ricky "Johnny Hoax" Madson, bassist, David Robledo, and drummer, Daniel "Danimal" Cathers, with their former bassist, Matt "Navajo Joe" Dreer. The band have released one extended play, Fight to Be Free, in 2009, with Thumper Punk Records. Their first studio album, Stumbling Through, was released in 2011 by Thumper Punk Records.

Background
The Hoax is a Christian hardcore band from the cities of Anaheim, California. Their members are lead vocalist, Tyler Dunagan, lead guitarist, Ricky "Johnny Hoax" Madson, bassist, David Robledo, and drummer, Daniel "Danimal" Cathers, with their former bassist, Matt "Navajo Joe" Dreer.

Music history
The band commenced as a musical entity in January 2005, with their release, Fight to Be Free, an extended play, being released by Thumper Punk Records on April 1, 2009. Their first studio album, Stumbling Through, was released on May 4, 2011, by Thumper Punk Records.

Members
Current members
 Tyler Dunagan - lead vocals
 Ricky "Johnny Hoax" Madson - lead guitar
 David Robledo - bass
 Daniel "Danimal" Cathers - drums
Past members
 Matt "Navajo Joe" Dreer - bass

Discography
Studio albums

 Stumbling Through (May 4, 2011, Thumper Punk)
EPs
 Free to Be Free (April 1, 2009, Thumper Punk)

References

External links
Facebook page

Musical groups from California
2005 establishments in California
Musical groups established in 2005